Science Park Mjärdevi (formerly Mjärdevi Science Park) is a city district and technology area in Östergötland in the city of Linköping.

The area is located just outside Linköping University Campus Valla. The area includes about 350 companies with a total of 6,500 employees (2017). Many of these companies have been started because of the innovations at Linköping University. The companies operate primarily in technology sectors such as telecommunications, business systems, software and systems engineering, electronics, home communications and vehicle safety. The largest residents of Mjärdevi are Ericsson, Releasy, IFS, Sectra, Infor, Combitech and CGI Group.

A computer history museum, IT-ceum, was built up in Mjärdevi in 2005. In 2009, it was relocated to the county museum, Östergötlands Museum.

References

External links
The homepage of Science Park Mjärdevi Science

Science parks in Sweden
Buildings and structures in Linköping